Athlitiki Enosi Lemesou, often abbreviated as AEL, is a Cypriot professional basketball club based in Limassol. The club, nicknamed The Queen, has been one of the most successful team in Cyprus since the beginning of the basketball in the island.

AEL holds the record for the number of national championships and Super Cups won. It is the only basketball club in Cyprus to have ever clinched a European title, having won the FIBA Regional Challenge Cup in 2003.

History
The club was founded in 1966 and it is one of the founding members of the Cyprus Basketball Federation. AEL took part in the first official championship in 1967 with Michalaki Nikolaidi as coach and it managed early on to establish itself as the "Queen" of Cyprus basketball.

AEL became the dominant team in Cyprus in the 1980s, a decade in which it won 13 titles in total (6 national championships, 5 Cups, and 2 Super Cups).

The 1990s did not bring about much success as the club ended up winning only one title (in 1999), which however was to signal the beginning of another golden era.

By winning 14 domestic competitions in the 2000s (5 national championships, 3 Cups, and 6 Super Cups), as well as a European crown (Regional Challenge Cup, South Conference 2003), AEL enjoyed the most successful period in its history and retained its title as the "Queen" of Cyprus basketball.

To this day, no other basketball club from Cyprus can claim to have ever been crowned with a European title or to have won five consecutive national championships in a row.

In October 2013, the club announced the basketball section would be dissolved due to its economical trouble. In August 2015 AEL Limassol announced it would form a basketball team for the following season on Division 2.

Three years later, September 2018 the club came back to the Cypriot top flight.

European record
In 2003, the club was crowned with its first European title after winning the newly established Regional Challenge Cup (South Conference). AEL clinched the title with the astonishing record of 10 victories in 10 games.
The victory signalled the beginning of the team's European success.

After winning the Regional Challenge Cup, AEL participated as Cypriot champions the following year in the new FIBA EuroCup and qualified from the group phase to the best of 16. In the group phase, AEL eliminated Peristeri and Paris Basket Racing. The club was eliminated in the round of 16 by Hapoel Tel Aviv.

AEL came close to repeat their achievement in the same competition in 2004–05.

In 2005–06 (when the competition changed format) AEL passed the first group round by finishing second, eliminating PAOK BC and Kallev Tallinn and reaching the second round (round of 16). The team finished last in the group.

The effort to reach the quarter finals was achieved in 2006–07 even though during this time AEL faced tougher opponents than the previous years. Being in a group (in the first round) with former European Champions Virtus Bologna, ASVEL Lyon-Villeurbanne and Astronauts Amsterdam, very few believed that AEL had a chance to qualify. However, the club achieved the unexpected and after the surprise victory against Virtus Bologna with a score 88–83 and the home win against the French giants Villeurbanne 84–58, AEL finished second in Group 2 and qualified to the second round with four wins and two losses.

Unlike the previous year when AEL finished with 0 points in the second round, being in the same group with CB Estudiantes, Liege Basket and BC Šiauliai, they finished second with 5 victories and 1 defeat – tied with the Estudiantes because of the matches between them. AEL beat Estudiantes 63–62 in order to reach the quarter finals. The club reached the quarter finals but the dream to reach the Final Four didn't become true after they were eliminated by the Ukrainian team Azovmash 2–1 in victories. AEL won at home 85–79 but was beaten away 88–63 and 97–69.

Players

2021–22 roster

Honours

Milestones

Team records

European campaigns

European victories

Home arena 

AEL plays its home games at the Nicos Solomonides indoor arena which was built in 2005 and which has a capacity of 2,500 seats.

It features the club's offices, official club shop, a cafe-restaurant, workout area and 12 VIP boxes.

The name was given after a former president of the club.

Supporters
The SY.F.AEL, οtherwise known as Gate 3, are the supporters of AEL basketball club.

They also support other clubs within the AEL sports association, particularly the football and volleyball clubs.

Gate 3 are well known for their amazing atmosphere in the Nicos Solomonides arena, particularly against arch-rivals Apollon Limassol.

Notable players

References

External links

AEL Limassol Club Official Website
AEL BC Official website 

Fans and supporters:
 Official SY.F.AEL Fans Website
Lions Radio 
Yellow City 3

Basketball teams in Cyprus
Basketball teams established in 1966
Sport in Limassol